Igor Olegovich Gorbachyov (1927–2003) was a Soviet and Russian actor, theater director and pedagogue. People's Artist of the USSR (1972). Hero of Socialist Labour (1987).

Biography

Early life and education
Igor Olegovich Gorbachyov was born October 20, 1927 in Leningrad in the family of a civil engineer.

Upon graduation from school in 1945, he entered the philosophy faculty of Leningrad University. During his studies, Igor Gorbachyov played in the student theater. At the All-Union show of amateur talent, he took first place for the role of Khlestakov in the play "The Inspector General". The student was noticed, and soon was invited to the same role in the film The Inspector General (1952), directed by Vladimir Petrov.

Theatre
In 1952, Igor Gorbachyov was accepted into the troupe of the Gorky Bolshoi Drama Theater without theatrical education. He played the role of Don Cesar de Bazan in the play "Rui Blas" by Victor Hugo, Florindo Areutusi in "The Servant of Two Masters" by Carlo Goldoni, Shvandu in the production of "Lyubov Yarovaya" by Konstantin Trenev.

In 1954, he moved to the Leningrad Academic Drama Theater named after Pushkin. At the same time, Gorbachyov entered the acting faculty of the Leningrad Theater Institute named after A.N. Ostrovsky which he graduated in 1959.

Virtually all of his life was connected with the Leningrad Drama Theater. The most successful works were played by him in the performances of the classical repertoire: Treplev in The Seagull by Anton Chekhov, Vaska Pepel in Maxim Gorky's play "The Lower Depths", Lavretsky in Ivan Turgenev's "Noble Nest", Protasov in the play "The Children of the Sun" by Maxim Gorky, Chichikov in "Dead Souls" by Nikolai Gogol, Cyrano de Bergerac in the eponymous play of Edmond Rostand.

Between 1975-1991 Igor Gorbachyov was the artistic director and chief director of the theater. He staged the productions: "Maria Tudor" by Victor Hugo (1964), "While the Heart beats" by Daniil Khrabrovitsky (1977), "Veranda in the Woods" by Ignaty Dvoretsky (1980), "Field Marshal Kutuzov" by Vladimir Solovyov (1985) and others.

Film
In the cinema, the actor began to appear in the 1950s after a successful debut as Khlestakov. He played mainly supporting roles, until the mid-1960s, when he started to get lead roles. He starred in the film All remains to People (1964), the crime drama Two Tickets for the afternoon session (1966). Gorbachyov participated in one of the well-known adaptations of Anton Chekhov, directed by Joseph Kheifitz on the novel "Ionych" - "In the city of S" (1966).

The greatest success to Gorbachyov was the role of Alexander Yakushev in the serial television film directed by Sergei Kolosov Operation "Trust"(1967).

In the 1970s, Igor Gorbachyov starred in the Detective Circle (1972) (sequel to the film Two Tickets for the Afternoon Session), historical-revolutionary film Sveaborg (1972), historical and biographical film Taming of the Fire (1972) and others.

In the 1980s, the artist performed roles in the films Seven Happy Notes (1981), Mother Mary (1982), For Blue Nights (1983), Prokhindiada, or Running in Place (1984) and others.

From the early 1990s, the actor started to receive less roles. His last work was a role in the detective series At the Knives (1998). In total, the actor has more than 50 roles in the cinema.

Teaching
In 1958-1975 and 1979-1991 Igor Gorbachyov taught at the Leningrad Institute of Theater, Music and Cinematography.
In 1992, Igor Gorbachyov founded the Theater Institute "School of Russian Drama" (now the theater art department of the School of Russian Drama named after IO Gorbachyov of the St. Petersburg State University of Service and Economics).

Death
On February 19, 2003, after a long illness, Igor Gorbachyov died. The actor is buried at the Literary Bridge of the Volkovo Cemetery in St. Petersburg.

Honors
In 1972 he was awarded the title People's Artist of the USSR. In 1973, the actor became a laureate of the State Prize of the RSFSR named after K.S. Stanislavsky. In 1987 he was awarded the title of Hero of Socialist Labor. The artist was awarded the Order of the October Revolution (1971), the Friendship of Peoples (1977), the Red Banner of Labor (1982), the Order of Lenin (1987).

In 2003, the Institute "School of Russian Drama" was named after Igor Gorbachyov.

Personal life
Gorbachyov was married to actress Lyudmila Gorbachyova (1930-2010), with whom she lived in marriage for more than 50 years.

The actor had a son, Igor.

Partial filmography

 The Inspector-General (1952) as Ivan Alexandrovich Khlestakov, the 'inspector general'
 Lyubov Yarovaya (1953) as Fyodor Shvandya
 Belinsky (1953) as student
 Commander of the Ship (1954) as Plaksin
 A Crazy Day (1956) as Kostya Galushkin, Klava Ignatyuk's husband  
  All Remains to People (1963) as Viktor Morozov
 Returned Music (1964)  as Eric the Light-Eyed
 Little Hare (1965) as Shabashnikov
 Two Tickets for a Daytime Picture Show (1967) as Nikolayev
 In S. City (1967) as Turkin
 Taming of the Fire (1972) as Yevgeniy Ognev
 A Circle (1972) as police colonel  Nikolay Nikolayev
 Eleven Hopes (1976) as Nikolai Ivanovich
 The Elder Son (1976, TV Movie) as Sarafanovs' neighbour (uncredited)
 Pugachev (1979) as Nikita Ivanovich Panin
 A Rogue's Saga (1984) as Mikhail Mikhailovich
 Silver Strings (1988) as Alexander III of Russia
 My Best Friend, General Vasili, Son of Joseph Stalin (1991) as Professor Serebrovsky

References

Bibliography 
 Ann C. Paietta. Saints, Clergy and Other Religious Figures on Film and Television, 1895–2003. McFarland, 2005.

External links 
 

1927 births
2003 deaths
20th-century Russian male actors
Communist Party of the Soviet Union members
Male actors from Saint Petersburg
Heroes of Socialist Labour
Honored Artists of the RSFSR
People's Artists of the RSFSR
People's Artists of the USSR
Recipients of the Order of Friendship of Peoples
Recipients of the Order of Lenin
Recipients of the Order of the Red Banner of Labour
Russian male film actors
Russian male stage actors
Theatre directors from Saint Petersburg
Soviet male film actors
Soviet male stage actors
Soviet theatre directors